Joan Martí i Alanis (29 November 1928 – 11 October 2009) was a former Bishop of Urgell and hence former co-Prince of Andorra. He was Bishop of Urgell from 1971 to 2003. He was a co-signatory, along with François Mitterrand, of Andorra's new constitution in 1993.

Notes

1928 births
2009 deaths
20th-century Princes of Andorra
21st-century Princes of Andorra
People from Alt Camp
Bishops from Catalonia
Bishops of Urgell
20th-century Roman Catholic bishops in Spain
21st-century Roman Catholic bishops in Spain